"I Got You" is a song by American musician Jack Johnson and is the lead single from his 2013 album From Here to Now to You. The song was released on June 10, 2013.

Release 
The song was released on June 10, 2013 as a CD single, 7' vinyl, and digital download along with the pre-order of the album.

Composition 
The song is mainly about his affection to his wife Kim, and about his love to his kids.

Music video 
On June 11, 2013, a colorful lyric video featuring a blue skied background was released. On June 28, the official music video was released on Jack's Vevo account. The video features Jack skateboarding in fields, at the beach, and working in public transit. The video was shot by using an old 16mm camera that was used to shoot surf films. The video debut at number 20 on VH1's top music video list, and has spawned over 27 million views on YouTube.

Chart performance 
"I Got You" debuted at number 88 on the Billboard Hot 100 for the chart week ending June 29, 2013, and peaked at number 26 on the Japan Hot 100.

Weekly charts

Year-end charts

Certifications

References 

Jack Johnson (musician) songs
2013 singles
2013 songs
Songs written by Jack Johnson (musician)